The enzyme 4-sulfomuconolactone hydrolase (EC 3.1.1.92; systematic name 4-sulfomuconolactone sulfohydrolase This enzyme catalyses the following chemical reaction

 4-sulfomuconolactone + H2O  maleylacetate + sulfite

The enzyme was isolated from the bacteria Hydrogenophaga intermedia and Agrobacterium radiobacter S2.

References

External links 
 

EC 3.1.1